The early modern period of modern history spans the period after the Late Middle Ages of the post-classical era to the beginning of the Age of Revolutions. Although the chronological limits of this period are open to debate, the timeframe is variously demarcated by historians as beginning with the Ottoman conquest of Constantinople in 1453, the Renaissance period in Europe and Timurid Central Asia, the Muslim conquests in the Indian subcontinent, the end of the Crusades, the Age of Discovery (especially the voyages of Christopher Columbus beginning in 1492 but also Vasco da Gama's discovery of the sea route to India in 1498), and ending around the French Revolution in 1789, or Napoleon's rise to power.

Historians in recent decades have argued that from a worldwide standpoint, the most important feature of the early modern period was its spreading globalizing character. New economies and institutions emerged, becoming more sophisticated and globally articulated over the course of the period. The early modern period also included the rise of the dominance of mercantilism as an economic theory. Other notable trends of the period include the development of experimental science, increasingly rapid technological progress, secularized civic politics, accelerated travel due to improvements in mapping and ship design, and the emergence of nation states.

Timeline 

This timetable gives a basic overview of states, cultures and events which transpired roughly between the years 1450 and 1850. Sections are broken by political and geographic location.

Dates are approximate. Consult particular article for details.
  Early modern themes   Other themes

Overview 

At the onset of the early modern period, trends in various regions of the world represented a shift away from medieval modes of organization, politically and economically. Feudalism declined in Europe, and Christendom saw the end of the Crusades and of religious unity in Western Europe under the Roman Catholic Church. The old order was destabilized by the Protestant Reformation, which caused a backlash that expanded the Inquisition and sparked the disastrous European wars of religion, which included the especially bloody Thirty Years' War and ended with the establishment of the modern international system in the Peace of Westphalia. Along with the European colonization of the Americas, this period also contained the Commercial Revolution and the Golden Age of Piracy. The globalization of the period can be seen in the medieval North Italian city-states and maritime republics, particularly Genoa, Venice, and Milan. Russia reached the Pacific coast in 1647 and consolidated its control over the Russian Far East in the 19th century. The Great Divergence took place as Western Europe greatly surpassed China in technology and per capita wealth.

As the Age of Revolutions dawned, beginning with revolts in America and France, political changes were then pushed forward in other countries partly as a result of upheavals of the Napoleonic Wars and their impact on thought and thinking, from concepts from nationalism to organizing armies. The early period ended in a time of political and economic change, as a result of mechanization in society, the American Revolution, and the first French Revolution; other factors included the redrawing of the map of Europe by the Final Act of the Congress of Vienna and the peace established by the Second Treaty of Paris, which ended the Napoleonic Wars.

In the Americas, pre-Columbian peoples had built a large and varied civilization, including the Aztec Empire, the Inca civilization, the Maya civilization and its cities, and the Muisca. The European colonization of the Americas began during the early modern period, as did the establishment of European trading hubs in Asia and Africa, which contributed to the spread of Christianity around the world. The rise of sustained contacts between previously isolated parts of the globe, in particular the Columbian Exchange that linked the Old World and the New World, greatly altered the human environment. Notably, the Atlantic slave trade and colonization of Native Americans began during this period. The Ottoman Empire conquered Southeastern Europe, and parts of West Asia and North Africa.

In the Islamic world, after the fall of the Timurid Renaissance, powers such as the Ottoman, Suri, Safavid, and Mughal empires grew in strength (three of which are known as gunpowder empires for the military technology that enabled them). Particularly in the Indian subcontinent, Mughal architecture, culture, and art reached their zenith, while the empire itself is believed to have had the world's largest economy, bigger than the entirety of Western Europe and worth 25% of global GDP. By the mid-18th century, India was a major proto-industrializing region.

Various Chinese dynasties and Japanese shogunates controlled the East Asian sphere. In Japan, the Edo period from 1600 to 1868 is also referred to as the early modern period. In Korea, the early modern period is considered to have lasted from the rise of the Joseon Dynasty to the enthronement of King Gojong. By the 16th century, Asian economies under the Ming dynasty and Mughal Bengal were stimulated by trade with the Portuguese, the Spanish, and the Dutch, while Japan engaged in the Nanban trade after the arrival of the first European Portuguese during the Azuchi–Momoyama period.

Meanwhile in Southeast Asia, the Toungoo Empire along with Ayutthaya experienced a golden age and ruled a large extent of Mainland Southeast Asia, with the Nguyen and Trinh lords de facto ruling the south and north of present day Vietnam respectively, whereas the Mataram Sultanate was the dominant power in Maritime Southeast Asian. The early modern period experienced an influx of European traders and missionaries into the region.

East Asia 
In Early Modern times, the major nations of East Asia attempted to pursue a course of Isolationism from the outside world but this policy was not always enforced uniformly or successfully. However, by the end of the Early Modern Period, China, Korea and Japan were mostly closed and disinterested to Europeans, even while trading relationships grew in port cities such as Guangzhou and Dejima.

Chinese dynasties 
Around the beginning of the ethnically Han Ming dynasty (1368–1644), China was leading the world in mathematics as well as science. However, Europe soon caught up to China's scientific and mathematical achievements and surpassed them. Many scholars have speculated about the reason behind China's lag in advancement. A historian named Colin Ronan claims that though there is no one specific answer, there must be a connection between China's urgency for new discoveries being weaker than Europe's and China's inability to capitalize on its early advantages. Ronan believes that China's Confucian bureaucracy and traditions led to China not having a scientific revolution, which led China to have fewer scientists to break the existing orthodoxies, like Galileo Galilei. Despite inventing gunpowder in the 9th century, it was in Europe that the classic handheld firearms, matchlocks, were invented, with evidence of use around the 1480s. China was using the matchlocks by 1540, after the Portuguese brought their matchlocks to Japan in the early 1500s. China during the Ming Dynasty established a bureau to maintain its calendar. The bureau was necessary because the calendars were linked to celestial phenomena and that needs regular maintenance because twelve lunar months have 344 or 355 days, so occasional leap months have to be added in order to maintain 365 days per year.
In the early Ming dynasty, urbanization increased as the population grew and as the division of labor grew more complex. Large urban centers, such as Nanjing and Beijing, also contributed to the growth of private industry. In particular, small-scale industries grew up, often specializing in paper, silk, cotton, and porcelain goods. For the most part, however, relatively small urban centers with markets proliferated around the country. Town markets mainly traded food, with some necessary manufactures such as pins or oil. In the 16th century the Ming dynasty flourished over maritime trade with the Portuguese, Spanish and Dutch Empires. The trade brought in a massive amount of silver, which China at the time needed desperately. Prior to China's global trade, its economy ran on a paper money. However, in the 14th century, China's paper money system suffered a crisis, and by the mid-15th century, crashed. The silver imports helped fill the void left by the broken paper money system, which helps explain why the value of silver in China was twice as high as the value of silver in Spain during the end of the 16th century.

China under the later Ming dynasty became isolated, prohibiting the construction of ocean going sea vessels. Despite isolationist policies the Ming economy still suffered from an inflation due to an overabundance of Spanish New World silver entering its economy through new European colonies such as Macau. Ming China was further strained by victorious but costly wars to protect Korea from Japanese Invasion. The European trade depression of the 1620s also hurt the Chinese economy, which sunk to the point where all of China's trading partners cut ties with them: Philip IV restricted shipments of exports from Acapulco, the Japanese cut off all trade with Macau, and the Dutch severed connections between Goa and Macau.

The damage to the economy was compounded by the effects on agriculture of the incipient Little Ice Age, natural calamities, crop failure and sudden epidemics. The ensuing breakdown of authority and people's livelihoods allowed rebel leaders, such as Li Zicheng, to challenge Ming authority.

The Ming dynasty fell around 1644 to the ethnically Manchu Qing dynasty, which would be the last dynasty of China. The Qing ruled from 1644 to 1912, with a brief, abortive restoration in 1917. During its reign, the Qing dynasty adopted many of the outward features of Chinese culture in establishing its rule, but did not necessarily "assimilate", instead adopting a more universalist style of governance. The Manchus were formerly known as the Jurchens. When Beijing was captured by Li Zicheng's peasant rebels in 1644, the Chongzhen Emperor, the last Ming emperor, committed suicide. The Manchus then allied with former Ming general Wu Sangui and seized control of Beijing, which became the new capital of the Qing dynasty. The Manchus adopted the Confucian norms of traditional Chinese government in their rule of China proper. Schoppa, the editor of The Columbia Guide to Modern Chinese History argues, "A date around 1780 as the beginning of modern China is thus closer to what we know today as historical 'reality'. It also allows us to have a better baseline to understand the precipitous decline of the Chinese polity in the nineteenth and twentieth centuries."

Japanese shogunates 

The Sengoku period that began around 1467 and lasted around a century consisted of several continually "warring states".

Following contact with the Portuguese on Tanegashima Isle in 1543, the Japanese adopted several of the technologies and cultural practices of their visitors, whether in the military area (the arquebus, European-style cuirasses, European ships), religion (Christianity), decorative art, language (integration to Japanese of a Western vocabulary) and culinary: the Portuguese introduced tempura and valuable refined sugar.

Central government was largely reestablished by Oda Nobunaga and Toyotomi Hideyoshi during the Azuchi–Momoyama period. Although a start date of 1573 is often given, in more broad terms, the period begins with Oda Nobunaga's entry into Kyoto in 1568, when he led his army to the imperial capital in order to install Ashikaga Yoshiaki as the 15th, and ultimately final, shōgun of the Ashikaga shogunate, and it lasts until the coming to power of Tokugawa Ieyasu after his victory over supporters of the Toyotomi clan at the Battle of Sekigahara in 1600. Tokugawa received the title of shōgun in 1603, establishing the Tokugawa shogunate.

The Edo period from 1600 to 1868 characterized early modern Japan. The Tokugawa shogunate was a feudalist regime of Japan established by Tokugawa Ieyasu and ruled by the shōguns of the Tokugawa clan. The period gets its name from the capital city, Edo, now called Tokyo. The Tokugawa shogunate ruled from Edo Castle from 1603 until 1868, when it was abolished during the Meiji Restoration in the late Edo period (often called the Late Tokugawa shogunate).

Society in the Japanese "Tokugawa period" (Edo society), unlike the shogunates before it, was based on the strict class hierarchy originally established by Toyotomi Hideyoshi. The daimyōs (feudal lords) were at the top, followed by the warrior-caste of samurai, with the farmers, artisans, and traders ranking below. The country was strictly closed to foreigners with few exceptions with the Sakoku policy. Literacy among the Japanese people rose in the two centuries of isolation.

In some parts of the country, particularly smaller regions, daimyōs and samurai were more or less identical, since daimyōs might be trained as samurai, and samurai might act as local lords. Otherwise, the largely inflexible nature of this social stratification system unleashed disruptive forces over time. Taxes on the peasantry were set at fixed amounts which did not account for inflation or other changes in monetary value. As a result, the tax revenues collected by the samurai landowners were worth less and less over time. This often led to numerous confrontations between noble but impoverished samurai and well-to-do peasants. None, however, proved compelling enough to seriously challenge the established order until the arrival of foreign powers.

Korean dynasty 
In 1392, General Yi Seong-gye established the Joseon dynasty (1392–1910) with a largely bloodless coup. Yi Seong-gye moved the capital of Korea to the location of modern-day Seoul. The dynasty was heavily influenced by Confucianism, which also played a large role to shaping Korea's strong cultural identity. King Sejong the Great (1418–1450), one of the only two kings in Korea's history to earn the title of great in their posthumous titles, reclaimed Korean territory to the north and created the Korean alphabet.

During the end of the 16th century, Korea was invaded twice by Japan, first in 1592 and again in 1597. Japan failed both times due to Admiral Yi Sun-sin, Korea's revered naval genius, who lead the Korean Navy using advanced metal clad ships called turtle ships. Because the ships were armed with cannons, Admiral Yi's navy was able to demolish the Japanese invading fleets, destroying hundreds of ships in Japan's second invasion. During the 17th century, Korea was invaded again, this time by Manchurians, who would later take over China as the Qing Dynasty. In 1637, King Injo was forced to surrender to the Qing forces, and was ordered to send princesses as concubines to the Qing Prince Dorgon.

After invasions from Manchuria, Joseon enjoyed nearly 200 years of peace. However, whatever power the kingdom recovered during its isolation further waned as the 18th century came to a close, and Korea was faced with internal strife, power struggles, international pressure and rebellions at home. The Joseon dynasty declined rapidly in the late 19th century.

South Asia

Indian empires

On the Indian subcontinent, the Lodi dynasty ruled over the Delhi Sultanate during its last phase. The dynasty founded by Bahlul Lodi ruled from 1451 to 1526. The dynasty's last ruler, Ibrahim Lodhi, was defeated and killed by Babur in the first Battle of Panipat. The Vijayanagara Empire was based in the Deccan Plateau, but its power was diminished after a major military defeat in 1565 by the Deccan sultanates. The empire is named after its capital city of Vijayanagara.

The rise of the Mughal Empire is usually dated from 1526, around the end of the Middle Ages. It was an Islamic Persianate imperial power that ruled most of the area as Hindustan by the late 17th and the early 18th centuries. The empire dominated South and Southwestern Asia,
becoming the biggest global economy and manufacturing power, with a nominal GDP that valued a quarter of world GDP, superior than the combination of Europe's GDP.
The "classic period" ended with the death of Mughal Emperor Aurangzeb, although the dynasty continued for another 150 years. During this period, the Empire was marked by a highly centralized administration connecting the different regions. All the significant monuments of the Mughals, their most visible legacy, date to this period which was characterised by the expansion of Persian cultural influence in the Indian subcontinent, with brilliant literary, artistic, and architectural results. The Maratha Empire was located in the south west of present-day India and expanded greatly under the rule of the Peshwas, the prime ministers of the Maratha empire. In 1761, the Maratha army lost the Third Battle of Panipat which halted imperial expansion and the empire was then divided into a confederacy of Maratha states.

British and Dutch colonization 

The development of New Imperialism saw the conquest of nearly all eastern hemisphere territories by colonial powers. The commercial colonization of India commenced in 1757, after the Battle of Plassey, when the Nawab of Bengal surrendered his dominions to the British East India Company, in 1765, when the company was granted the diwani, or the right to collect revenue, in Bengal and Bihar, or in 1772, when the company established a capital in Calcutta, appointed its first Governor-General, Warren Hastings, and became directly involved in governance.

The Maratha states, following the Anglo-Maratha wars, eventually lost to the British East India Company in 1818 with the Third Anglo-Maratha War. The rule lasted until 1858, when, after the Indian rebellion of 1857 and consequent of the Government of India Act 1858, the British government assumed the task of directly administering India in the new British Raj. In 1819, Stamford Raffles established Singapore as a key trading post for Britain in their rivalry with the Dutch. However, their rivalry cooled in 1824 when an Anglo-Dutch treaty demarcated their respective interests in Southeast Asia. From the 1850s onwards, the pace of colonization shifted to a significantly higher gear.

The Dutch East India Company (1800) and British East India Company (1858) were dissolved by their respective governments, who took over the direct administration of the colonies. Only Thailand was never colonized by a European power, although, Thailand itself was also greatly affected by the power politics of the Western powers. Colonial rule had a profound effect on Southeast Asia. While the colonial powers profited much from the region's vast resources and large market, colonial rule did develop the region to a varying extent. Commercial agriculture, mining and an export based economy developed rapidly during this period.

Southeast Asia 
At the start of the modern era, the Spice Route between India and China crossed Majapahit, an archipelagic empire based on the island of Java. It was the last of the major Hindu empires of Maritime Southeast Asia and is considered one of the greatest states in Indonesian history. Its influence extended to states in Sumatra, the Malay Peninsula, Borneo and eastern Indonesia, but the effectiveness of their exact influence is the subject of debate. Majapahit found itself unable to control the rising power of the Sultanate of Malacca, which grew to stretch from Muslim Malay settlements of Phuket, Satun and Pattani (bordering Ayutthaya) in the north to Sumatra in the southwest. The Portuguese invaded its capital in 1511 and in 1528 the Sultanate of Johor was established by a Malaccan prince to succeed Malacca.

Middle East and North Africa

Ottoman Empire 

During the early modern era, the Ottoman Empire enjoyed an expansion and consolidation of power, leading to a Pax Ottomana. This was perhaps the golden age of the empire. The Ottomans expanded southwest into North Africa while battling with the re-emergent Persian Shi'a Safavid Empire to the east.

North Africa 
In the Ottoman sphere, the Turks seized Egypt in 1517 and established the regencies of Algeria, Tunisia, and Tripolitania (between 1519 and 1551), Morocco remaining an independent Arabized Berber state under the Sharifan dynasty.

Safavid Iran 

The Safavid Empire was a great Shia Persianate empire after the Islamic conquest of Persia and established of Islam, marking an important point in the history of Islam in the east. The Safavid dynasty was founded about 1501. From their base in Ardabil, the Safavids established control over all of Persia and reasserted the Iranian identity of the region, thus becoming the first native dynasty since the Sassanids to establish a unified Iranian state. Problematic for the Safavids was the powerful Ottoman Empire. The Ottomans, a Sunni dynasty, fought several campaigns against the Safavids.

What fueled the growth of Safavid economy was its position between the burgeoning civilizations of Europe to its west and Islamic Central Asia to its east and north. The Silk Road, which led from Europe to East Asia, revived in the 16th century. Leaders also supported direct sea trade with Europe, particularly England and The Netherlands, which sought Persian carpet, silk, and textiles. Other exports were horses, goat hair, pearls, and an inedible bitter almond hadam-talka used as a spice in India. The main imports were spice, textiles (woolens from Europe, cotton from Gujarat), metals, coffee, and sugar. Despite their demise in 1722, the Safavids left their mark by establishing and spreading Shi'a Islam in major parts of the Caucasus and West Asia.

Uzbeks and Afghan Pashtuns 

In the 16th to early 18th centuries, Central Asia was under the rule of Uzbeks, and the far eastern portions were ruled by the local Pashtuns. Between the 15th and 16th centuries, various nomadic tribes arrived from the steppes, including the Kipchaks, Naimans, Kangly, Khongirad, and Manghuds. These groups were led by Muhammad Shaybani, who was the Khan of the Uzbeks.

The lineage of the Afghan Pashtuns stretches back to the Hotaki dynasty. Following Muslim Arab and Turkic conquests, Pashtun ghazis (warriors for the faith) invaded and conquered much of northern India during the Lodhi dynasty and Suri dynasty. Pashtun forces also invaded Persia, and the opposing forces were defeated in the Battle of Gulnabad. The Pashtuns later formed the Durrani Empire.

Europe 

Many major events caused Europe to change around the start of the 16th century, starting with the Fall of Constantinople in 1453, the fall of Muslim Spain and the discovery of the Americas in 1492, and Martin Luther's Protestant Reformation in 1517. In England the modern period is often dated to the start of the Tudor period with the victory of Henry VII over Richard III at the Battle of Bosworth in 1485. Early modern European history is usually seen to span from the start of the 15th century, through the Age of Enlightenment in the 17th and 18th centuries, until the beginning of the Industrial Revolution in the late 18th century.

The early modern period is taken to end with the French Revolution, the Napoleonic Wars, and the Dissolution of the Holy Roman Empire at the Congress of Vienna. At the end of the early modern period, the British and Russian empires had emerged as world powers from the multipolar contest of colonial empires, while the three great Asian empires of the early modern period, Ottoman Turkey, Mughal India and Qing China, all entered a period of stagnation or decline.

Renaissance vs. early modern period 

The expression "early modern" is at times used as a substitute for the term Renaissance. However, "Renaissance" is properly used in relation to a diverse series of cultural developments that occurred over several hundred years in many different parts of Europe—especially central and northern Italy—and it spans the transition from late medieval civilization to the opening of the early modern period. In the visual arts and architecture, the term "early modern" is not a common designation as the Renaissance period is clearly distinct from what came later. Only in the study of literature is the early modern period a standard designation (early modern literature). European music of the period is generally divided between Renaissance and Baroque. Similarly, philosophy is divided between Renaissance philosophy and the Enlightenment. In other fields, there is far more continuity through the period such as warfare and science.

Gunpowder and firearms 
When gunpowder was introduced to Europe, it was immediately used almost exclusively in weapons and explosives for warfare. Though it was invented in China, gunpowder arrived in Europe already formulated for military use and European countries took advantage of it and were the first to create the classic firearms. The advances made in gunpowder and firearms was directly tied to the decline in the use of plate armor because of the inability of the armor to protect one from bullets. The musket was able to penetrate all forms of armor available at the time, making armor obsolete, and as a consequence the heavy musket as well. Although there is relatively little to no difference in design between arquebus and musket except in size and strength, it was the term musket which remained in use up into the 1800s.

European kingdoms and movements 
In the early modern period, the Holy Roman Empire was a union of territories in Central Europe under a Holy Roman Emperor the first of which was Otto I. The last was Francis II, who abdicated and dissolved the Empire in 1806 during the Napoleonic Wars. Despite its name, for much of its history the Empire did not include Rome within its borders.

The Renaissance was a cultural movement that began in the 14th century, beginning in Italy in the Late Middle Ages and later spreading to the rest of Europe. The term is also used more loosely to refer to the historic era, but since the changes of the Renaissance were not uniform across Europe, this is a general use of the term. As a cultural movement, it encompassed a rebellion of learning based on classical sources, the development of linear perspective in painting, and gradual but widespread educational reform.

Notable individuals 

Johannes Gutenberg is credited as the first European to use movable type printing, around 1439, and as the global inventor of the mechanical printing press. Nicolaus Copernicus formulated a comprehensive heliocentric cosmology (1543), which displaced the Earth from the center of the universe. His book, De revolutionibus orbium coelestium (On the Revolutions of the Celestial Spheres) began modern astronomy and sparked the Scientific Revolution. Another notable individual was Machiavelli, an Italian political philosopher, considered a founder of modern political science. Machiavelli is most famous for a short political treatise, The Prince, a work of realist political theory. The Swiss Paracelsus (1493–1541) is associated with a medical revolution while the Anglo-Irish Robert Boyle was one of the founders of modern chemistry. In visual arts, notable representatives included the "three giants of the High Renaissance", namely Leonardo da Vinci, Michelangelo, and Raphael, Albrecht Dürer (often considered the greatest artist of Northern Renaissance), Titian from the Venetian school, Peter Paul Rubens of the Flemish Baroque traditions. Famous composers included Guillaume Du Fay, Heinrich Isaac, Josquin des Prez, Giovanni Pierluigi da Palestrina, Claudio Monteverdi, Jean-Baptiste Lully.

Among the notable royalty of the time was Charles the Bold (1433–1477), the last Valois Duke of Burgundy, known as Charles the Bold (or Rash) to his enemies, His early death was a pivotal moment in European history. Charles has often been regarded as the last representative of the feudal spirit, although in administrative affairs, he introduced remarkable modernizing innovations. Upon his death, Charles left an unmarried nineteen-year-old daughter, Mary of Burgundy, as his heir. Her marriage would have enormous implications for the political balance of Europe. Frederick III, Holy Roman Emperor secured the match for his son, the future Maximilian I, Holy Roman Emperor, with the aid of Mary's stepmother, Margaret. In 1477, the territory of the Duchy of Burgundy was annexed by France. In the same year, Mary married Maximilian, Archduke of Austria. A conflict between the Burgundian side (Maximilian brought with himself almost no resources from the Empire) and France ensued, culminating in the Treaty of Senlis(1493) which gave the majority of Burgundian inheritance to the Habsburg (Mary already died in 1482). The rise of the Habsburg dynasty was a prime factor in the spreading of the Renaissance.

In Central Europe, King Matthias Corvinus (1443–1490), a notable nation builder, conqueror (Hungary in his time was the most powerful in Central Europe) and patron, was the first who introduced the Renaissance outside of Italy. In military area, he introduced the Black Army, one of the first standing armies in Europe and a remarkably modern force.

Some noblemen from the generation that lived during this period have been attributed the moniker "the last knight", with the most notable being the above mentioned Maximilian I (1459–1519), Chevalier de Bayard(1476–1524), Franz von Sickingen(1481–1523) and Götz von Berlichingen(1480–1562). Maximilian (although Claude Michaud opines that he could claim "last knight" status by virtue of being the last medieval epic poet.) was actually a chief modernizing force of the time (whose reform initiatives led to Europe-wide revolutions in the areas of warfare and communications, among others), who broke the back of the knight class (causing many to become robber barons) and had personal conflicts with the three other men on the matter of the knight's status. 

Claude de Lorraine was the first Duke of Guise, from 1528 to his death. Claude distinguished himself at the battle of Marignano (1515), and was long in recovering from the twenty-two wounds he received in the battle. In 1521, he fought at Fuenterrabia, and Louise of Savoy ascribed the capture of the place to his efforts. In 1523 he became governor of Champagne and Burgundy, after defeating at Neufchâteau the imperial troops who had invaded this province. In 1525 he destroyed the Anabaptist peasant army, which was overrunning Lorraine, at Lupstein, near Saverne (Zabern). On the return of Francis I from captivity in 1528, Claude was made Duke of Guise in the peerage of France, though up to this time only princes of the royal house had held the title of duke and peer of France. The Guises, as cadets of the sovereign house of Lorraine and descendants of the house of Anjou, claimed precedence of the Bourbon princes of Condé and Conti.

The 3rd Duke of Alba was a nobleman of importance in the early modern period, nicknamed the "Iron Duke" by the Protestants of the Low Countries because of his harsh rule and cruelty. Tales of atrocities committed during his military operations in Flanders became part of Dutch and English folklore, forming a central component of the Spanish Black Legend.

In England, Henry VIII was the King of England and a significant figure in the history of the English monarchy. Although in the greater part of his reign he brutally suppressed the influence of the Protestant Reformation in England (see also Martyrdom of William Tyndale.) a movement having some roots with John Wycliffe in the 14th century, he is more popularly known for his political struggles with Rome. These struggles ultimately led to the separation of the Church of England from papal authority, the Dissolution of the Monasteries, and establishing himself as the Supreme Head of the Church of England. Though Henry reportedly became a Protestant on his death-bed, he advocated Catholic ceremony and doctrine throughout his life. Royal support for the English Reformation began with his heirs, the devout Edward VI and the renowned Elizabeth I, whilst daughter Mary I temporarily reinstated papal authority over England. Henry also oversaw the legal union of England and Wales with the Laws in Wales Acts 1535–1542. He is also noted for his six wives, two of whom were beheaded.

Christians and Christendom 

Christianity was challenged at the beginning of the modern period with the fall of Constantinople in 1453 and later by various movements to reform the church (including Lutheran, Zwinglian, and Calvinist), followed by the Counter Reformation.

End of the Crusades and unity 

The Hussite Crusades involved the military actions against and amongst the followers of Jan Hus in Bohemia ending ultimately with the Battle of Grotniki. Also known as the Hussite Wars, they were arguably the first European war in which hand-held gunpowder weapons such as muskets made a decisive contribution. The Taborite faction of the Hussite warriors were basically infantry, and their many defeats of larger armies with heavily armored knights helped effect the infantry revolution. In totality, the Hussite Crusades were inconclusive.

The last crusade, the Crusade of 1456, was organized to counter the expanding Ottoman Empire and lift the Siege of Belgrade, and was led by John Hunyadi and Giovanni da Capistrano. The siege eventually escalated into a major battle, during which Hunyadi led a sudden counterattack that overran the Turkish camp, ultimately compelling the wounded Sultan Mehmet II to lift the siege and retreat. The siege of Belgrade has been characterized as having "decided the fate of Christendom". The noon bell ordered by Pope Callixtus III commemorates the victory throughout the Christian world to this day.

Nearly a hundred years later, the Peace of Augsburg officially ended the idea that all Christians could be united under one church. The principle of cuius regio, eius religio ("whose the region is, [it shall have] his religion") established the religious, political and geographic divisions of Christianity, and this was established in international law with the Treaty of Westphalia in 1648, which legally ended the concept of a single Christian hegemony, i.e. the "One, Holy, Catholic, and Apostolic Church" of the Nicene Creed. Each government determined the religion of their own state. Christians living in states where their denomination was not the established church were guaranteed the right to practice their faith in public during allotted hours and in private at their will. With the Treaty of Westphalia, the Wars of Religion came to an end, and in the Treaty of Utrecht of 1713 the concept of the sovereign national state was born. The Corpus Christianum has since existed with the modern idea of a tolerant and diverse society consisting of many different communities.

Inquisitions and Reformations 
The modern Inquisition refers to any one of several institutions charged with trying and convicting heretics (or other offenders against canon law) within the Catholic Church. In the modern era, the first manifestation was the Spanish Inquisition of 1478 to 1834. The Inquisition prosecuted individuals accused of a wide array of crimes related to heresy, including sorcery, blasphemy, Judaizing and witchcraft, as well for censorship of printed literature. Because of its objective—combating heresy—the Inquisition had jurisdiction only over baptized members of the Church (which, however, encompassed the vast majority of the population in Catholic countries). Secular courts could still try non-Christians for blasphemy (most of the witch trials went through secular courts).

The Protestant Reformation and rise of modernity in the early 16th century entailed the start of a series of changes in the Corpus Christianum. Martin Luther challenged the Catholic Church with his Ninety-five Theses, generally accepted as the beginning of the Reformation, a Christian reform movement in Europe, though precursors such as Jan Hus predate him. The Protestant movement of the 16th century occurred under the protection of the Electorate of Saxony, an independent hereditary electorate of the Holy Roman Empire. The Elector Frederick III established a university at Wittenberg in 1502. The Augustinian monk Martin Luther became professor of philosophy there in 1508. At the same time, he became one of the preachers at the castle church of Wittenberg.

On 31 October 1517, Luther posted his Ninety-five Theses on the door of the All Saints' Church, which served as a notice board for university-related announcements. These were points for debate that criticized the Church and the Pope. The most controversial points centered on the practice of selling indulgences (especially by Johann Tetzel) and the Church's policy on purgatory. The reform movement soon split along certain doctrinal lines. Religious disagreements between various leading figures led to the emergence of rival Protestant churches. The most important denominations to emerge directly from the Reformation were the Lutherans, and the Reformed/Calvinists/Presbyterians. The process of reform had decidedly different causes and effects in other countries. In England, where it gave rise to Anglicanism, the period became known as the English Reformation. Subsequent Protestant denominations generally trace their roots back to the initial reforming movements.

The Diet of Worms in 1521, presided by Emperor Charles V, declared Martin Luther a heretic and an outlaw (although Charles V was more preoccupied with maintaining his vast empire than with arresting Luther). As a result of Charles V's distractions in East Europe and in Spain, he agreed through the Diet of Speyer in 1526 to allow German princes to effectively decide themselves whether to enforce the Edict of Worms or not, for the time being. After returning to the empire, Charles V attended the Diet of Augsburg in 1530 to order all Protestants in the empire to revert to Catholicism. In response, the Protestant territories in and around Germany formed the Schmalkaldic League to fight against the Catholic Holy Roman Empire. Charles V left again to handle the advance of the Ottoman Turks. He returned in 1547 to launch a military campaign against the Schmalkaldic League and to issue an imperial law requiring all Protestants to return to Catholic practices (with a few superficial concessions to Protestant practices). Warfare ended when Charles V relented in the Peace of Passau (1552) and in the Peace of Augsburg (1555), which formalized the law that the rulers of a land decide its religion.

Of the late Inquisitions in the modern era, there were two different manifestations:
 the Portuguese Inquisition (1536–1821)
 the Roman Inquisition (1542–1860)
This Portuguese inquisition was a local analogue of the more famous Spanish Inquisition. The Roman Inquisition covered most of the Italian peninsula as well as Malta and also existed in isolated pockets of papal jurisdiction in other parts of Europe, including Avignon.

The Catholic Reformation began in 1545 when the Council of Trent was called in reaction to the Protestant Rebellion. The idea was to reform the state of worldliness and disarray that had befallen some of the clergy of the Church, while reaffirming the spiritual authority of the Catholic Church and its position as the sole true Church of Christ on Earth. The effort sought to prevent further damage to the Church and her faithful at the hands of the newly formed Protestant denominations.

Tsardom of Russia 

In development of the Third Rome ideas, the Grand Duke Ivan IV (the "Awesome" or "the Terrible") was officially crowned the first Tsar ("Caesar") of Russia in 1547. The Tsar promulgated a new code of laws (Sudebnik of 1550), established the first Russian feudal representative body (Zemsky Sobor) and introduced local self-management into the rural regions. During his long reign, Ivan IV nearly doubled the already large Russian territory by annexing the three Tatar khanates (parts of disintegrated Golden Horde): Kazan and Astrakhan along the Volga River, and Sibirean Khanate in South Western Siberia. Thus by the end of the 16th century Russia was transformed into a multiethnic, multiconfessional and transcontinental state.

Russia experienced territorial growth through the 17th century, which was the age of Cossacks. Cossacks were warriors organized into military communities, resembling pirates and pioneers of the New World. The native land of the Cossacks is defined by a line of Russian/Ruthenian town-fortresses located on the border with the steppe and stretching from the middle Volga to Ryazan and Tula, then breaking abruptly to the south and extending to the Dnieper via Pereyaslavl. This area was settled by a population of free people practicing various trades and crafts.

In 1648, the peasants of Ukraine joined the Zaporozhian Cossacks in rebellion against Poland–Lithuania during the Khmelnytsky Uprising, because of the social and religious oppression they suffered under Polish rule. In 1654 the Ukrainian leader, Bohdan Khmelnytsky, offered to place Ukraine under the protection of the Russian Tsar, Aleksey I. Aleksey's acceptance of this offer led to another Russo-Polish War (1654–1667). Finally, Ukraine was split along the river Dnieper, leaving the western part (or Right-bank Ukraine) under Polish rule and eastern part (Left-bank Ukraine and Kiev) under Russian. Later, in 1670–71 the Don Cossacks led by Stenka Razin initiated a major uprising in the Volga region, but the Tsar's troops were successful in defeating the rebels. In the east, the rapid Russian exploration and colonisation of the huge territories of Siberia was led mostly by Cossacks hunting for valuable furs and ivory. Russian explorers pushed eastward primarily along the Siberian river routes, and by the mid-17th century there were Russian settlements in the Eastern Siberia, on the Chukchi Peninsula, along the Amur River, and on the Pacific coast. In 1648 the Bering Strait between Asia and North America was passed for the first time by Fedot Popov and Semyon Dezhnyov.

Discovery and trade 

The Age of Discovery was a period from the early 15th century and continuing into the early 17th century, during which European ships traveled around the world to search for new trading routes and partners to feed burgeoning capitalism in Europe. They also were in search of trading goods such as gold, silver and spices. In the process, Europeans encountered peoples and mapped lands previously unknown to them. This factor in the early European modern period was a globalizing character; the 'discovery' of the Americas and the rise of sustained contacts between previously isolated parts of the globe was an important historical event.

The search for new routes was based on the fact that the Silk Road was controlled by the Ottoman Empire, which was an impediment to European commercial interests, and other Eastern trade routes were not available to the Europeans due to Muslim control. The ability to outflank the Muslim states of North Africa was seen as crucial to European survival. At the same time, the Iberians learnt much from their Arab neighbors. The northwestern region of Eurasia has a very long coastline, and has arguably been more influenced by its maritime history than any other continent. Europe is uniquely situated between several navigable seas, and intersected by navigable rivers running into them in a way that greatly facilitated the influence of maritime traffic and commerce. In the maritime history of Europe, the carrack and caravel both incorporated the lateen sail that made ships far more maneuverable. By translating the Arab versions of lost ancient Greek geographical works into Latin, European navigators acquired a deeper knowledge of the shape of Africa and Asia.

Mercantile capitalism 

Mercantilism was the dominant school of economic thought throughout the early modern period (from the 16th to the 18th century). This led to some of the first instances of significant government intervention and control over the economy, and it was during this period that much of the modern capitalist system was established. Internationally, mercantilism encouraged the many European wars of the period and fueled European imperialism. Belief in mercantilism began to fade in the late 18th century, as the arguments of Adam Smith and the other classical economists won out.

The Commercial Revolution was a period of economic expansion, colonialism, and mercantilism that lasted from approximately the 16th century until the early 18th century. Beginning with the Crusades, Europeans rediscovered spices, silks, and other commodities rare in Europe. This development created a new desire for trade, which expanded in the second half of the Middle Ages. European nations, through voyages of discovery, were looking for new trade routes in the fifteenth and sixteenth centuries, which allowed the European powers to build vast, new international trade networks. Nations also sought new sources of wealth. To deal with this new-found wealth, new economic theories and practices were created. Because of competing national interest, nations had the desire for increased world power through their colonial empires. The Commercial Revolution is marked by an increase in general commerce, and in the growth of non-manufacturing pursuits, such as banking, insurance, and investing.

Trade and the new economy 
In the Old World, the most desired trading goods were gold, silver, and spices. Western Europeans used the compass, new sailing ship technologies, new maps, and advances in astronomy to seek a viable trade route to Asia for valuable spices that Mediterranean powers could not contest.

In terms of shipping advances, the most important developments were the creation of the carrack and caravel designs in Portugal. These vessels evolved from medieval European designs from the North Sea and both the Christian and Islamic Mediterranean. They were the first ships that could leave the relatively placid and calm Mediterranean, Baltic or North Sea and sail safely on the open Atlantic. When the carrack and then the caravel were developed in Iberia, European thoughts returned to the fabled East. These explorations have a number of causes. Monetarists believe the main reason the Age of Exploration began was because of a severe shortage of bullion in Europe. The European economy was dependent on gold and silver currency, but low domestic supplies had plunged much of Europe into a recession. Another factor was the centuries-long conflict between the Iberians and the Muslims to the south.

Piracy's Golden Age 

The Golden Age of Piracy is a designation given to one or more outbursts of piracy in the early modern period, spanning from the mid-17th century to the mid-18th century. The buccaneering period covers approximately the late 17th century. The period is characterized by Anglo-French seamen based on Jamaica and Tortuga attacking Spanish colonies and shipping in the Caribbean and eastern Pacific. A sailing route known as the Pirate Round was followed by certain Anglo-American pirates at the turn of the 18th century, associated with long-distance voyages from Bermuda and the Americas to rob Muslim and East India Company targets in the Indian Ocean and Red Sea. The post-Spanish Succession period extending into the early 18th century, when Anglo-American sailors and privateers left unemployed by the end of the War of the Spanish Succession turned en masse to piracy in the Caribbean, the American eastern seaboard, the West African coast, and the Indian Ocean.

European states and politics 

The 15th to 18th century period is marked by the first European colonies, the rise of strong centralized governments, and the beginnings of recognizable European nation states that are the direct antecedents of today's states. Although the Renaissance included revolutions in many intellectual pursuits, as well as social and political upheaval, it is perhaps best known for European artistic developments and the contributions of such polymaths as Leonardo da Vinci and Michelangelo, who inspired the term "Renaissance man".

During the Baroque period the Thirty Years' War in Central Europe decimated the population by up to 20%. In 1648, the Peace of Westphalia, consisting of the treaties of Osnabrück and Münster, signed on May 15 and October 24, respectively, ended several wars in Europe and established the beginning of sovereign states. The treaties involved the Holy Roman Emperor, Ferdinand III (Habsburg), the Kingdoms of Spain, France and Sweden, the Netherlands and their respective allies among the princes and the Republican Imperial States of the Holy Roman Empire.

The Peace of Westphalia resulted from the first modern diplomatic congress.  Until 1806, the regulations became part of the constitutional laws of the Holy Roman Empire. The Treaty of the Pyrenees, signed in 1659, ended the war between France and Spain and is often considered part of the overall accord.

Absolutism 
The Age of Absolutism describes the monarchical power that was unrestrained by any other institutions, such as churches, legislatures, or social elites of the European monarchs during the transition from feudalism to capitalism. Monarchs described as absolute can especially be found in the 17th century through the 19th century. Nations that adopted Absolutism include France, Prussia, and Russia. Nobles tended to trade privileges for allegiance throughout the eighteenth century, so that the interests of the nobility aligned with that of the crown. Absolutism is characterized by the ending of feudal partitioning, consolidation of power with the monarch, rise of state power, unification of the state laws, drastic increase in tax revenue collected by the monarch, and a decrease in the influence of nobility.

French power 
For much of the reign of Louis XIV, who was known as the Sun King (French: le Roi Soleil), France stood as the leading power in Europe, engaging in three major wars—the Franco-Dutch War, the War of the League of Augsburg, and the War of the Spanish Succession—and two minor conflicts—the War of Devolution, and the War of the Reunions. Louis ruled according to the Divine Right of Kings, the theory that the King was crowned by God and accountable to him alone. Consequently, he has long been considered the archetypal absolute monarch. Louis XIV continued the work of his predecessor to create a centralized state, governed from the capital to sweep away the remnants of feudalism that persisted in parts of France. He succeeded in breaking the power of the provincial nobility, much of which had risen in revolt during his minority called the Fronde, and forced many leading nobles to live with him in his lavish Palace of Versailles.

Men who featured prominently in the political and military life of France during this period include Mazarin, Jean-Baptiste Colbert, Turenne, Vauban. French culture likewise flourished during this era, producing a number of figures of great renown, including Molière, Racine, Boileau, La Fontaine, Lully, Le Brun, Rigaud, Louis Le Vau, Jules Hardouin Mansart, Claude Perrault and Le Nôtre.

Early English revolutions 
Before the Age of Revolution, the English Civil War was a series of armed conflicts and political machinations between Parliamentarians and Royalists. The first and second civil wars pitted the supporters of King Charles I against the supporters of the Long Parliament, while the third war saw fighting between supporters of King Charles II and supporters of the Rump Parliament. The Civil War ended with the Parliamentary victory at the Battle of Worcester. The monopoly of the Church of England on Christian worship in England ended with the victors consolidating the established Protestant Ascendancy in Ireland. Constitutionally, the wars established the precedent that an English monarch cannot govern without Parliament's consent. The English Restoration, or simply put as the Restoration, began in 1660 when the English, Scottish and Irish monarchies were all restored under Charles II after the Commonwealth of England that followed the English Civil War. The Glorious Revolution of 1688 establishes modern parliamentary democracy in England.

International balance of power 
The War of the Spanish Succession was a war fought between 1701 and 1714, in which several European powers combined to stop a possible unification of the Kingdoms of Spain and France under a single Bourbon monarch, upsetting the European balance of power. It was fought mostly in Europe, but it included Queen Anne's War in North America. The war was marked by the military leadership of notable generals like the duc de Villars, the Jacobite Duke of Berwick, the Duke of Marlborough and Prince Eugene of Savoy.

The Peace of Utrecht established after a series of individual peace treaties signed in the Dutch city of Utrecht concluded between various European states helped end the War of the Spanish Succession. The representatives who met were Louis XIV of France and Philip V of Spain on the one hand, and representatives of Queen Anne of Great Britain, the Duke of Savoy, and the United Provinces on the other. The treaty enregistered the defeat of French ambitions expressed in the wars of Louis XIV and preserved the European system based on the balance of power. The Treaty of Utrecht marked the change from Spanish to British naval supremacy.

Sub-Saharan Africa 

The Songhai Empire took control of the trans-Saharan trade at the beginning of the modern era. It seized Timbuktu in 1468 and Jenne in 1473, building the regime on trade revenues and the cooperation of Muslim merchants. The empire eventually made Islam the official religion, built mosques, and brought Muslim scholars to Gao.

Around the beginning of the modern era, the Benin Kingdom was an independent trading power in the southeastern coastline of West Africa, blocking the access of other inland nations to the coastal ports. Benin may have housed 100,000 inhabitants at its height, spreading over twenty-five square kilometres, enclosed by three concentric rings of earthworks. By the late 15th century Benin was in contact with Portugal. At its apogee in the 16th and 17th centuries, Benin encompassed parts of southeastern Yorubaland and the western Igbo.

In the Ethiopian Highlands, the Solomonic dynasty established itself in the 13th century. Claiming direct descent from the old Axumite royal house, the Solomonic ruled the region well into modern history. In the 16th century, Shewa and the rest of Abyssinia were conquered by the forces of Ahmed Gurey of the Adal Sultanate to the northwest. The conquest of the area by the Oromo ended in the contraction of both Adal and Abyssinia, changing regional dynamics for centuries to come.

The Ajuran Empire, which was one of the largest and strongest empires in the Horn of Africa, began to decline in the 17th century, and several powerful successor states came to prominence. The Geledi Sultanate, established by Ibrahim Adeer, was a notable successor of the Ajuran Sultanate. The Sultanate reached its apex under the successive reigns of Sultan Yusuf Mahamud Ibrahim (reigned 1798 to 1848), who successfully consolidated Geledi power during the Bardera wars, and Sultan Ahmed Yusuf, who forced regional powers such as the Omani Empire to pay tribute. The Majeerteen Sultanate was a Somali Sultanate in the Horn of Africa. Ruled by King Osman Mahamuud during its golden age, it controlled much of northern and central Somalia in the 19th and early 20th centuries. The polity had all of the organs of an integrated modern state and maintained a robust trading network. Along with the Sultanate of Hobyo ruled by Sultan Yusuf Ali Kenadid, the Majeerteen Sultanate was eventually annexed into Italian Somaliland in the early 20th century, following the military Campaign of the Sultanates.

Americas 

The term colonialism is normally used with reference to discontiguous overseas empires rather than contiguous land-based empires, European or otherwise. European colonisation during the 15th to 19th centuries resulted in the spread of Christianity to Sub-Saharan Africa, the Americas, Australia and the Philippines.

Exploration and conquest of the Americas 

Christopher Columbus came to the Americas in 1492. Subsequently, the major sea powers in Europe sent expeditions to the New World to build trade networks and colonies and to convert the native peoples to Christianity. Pope Alexander VI divided newly discovered lands outside Europe between Spain and Portugal along a north–south meridian 370 leagues west of the Cape Verde islands (off the west coast of Africa). The division was never accepted by the rulers of England or France.

Colonial Latin America 

What is now called Latin America, a designation first used in the late 19th century, was claimed by Spain and Portugal. The Western Hemisphere, the New World, was divided between the two Iberian powers by the Treaty of Tordesillas in what until the late 16th-century, was an area that could be called "Ibero-America". Spain called its overseas empire there "The Indies", with Portugal calling its territory in South America Brazil, after the dyewood found there. Spain concentrated building its empire where there were large indigenous populations, "Indians", who could be compelled to work and large deposits of precious metals, mainly silver. Both New Spain (colonial Mexico) and Peru fit those criteria and the Spanish crown established viceroyalties to rule those two large areas. As Spanish settlements and the economy grew in size and complexity, the Spanish established viceroyalties in the eighteenth century during administrative reforms Rio de la Plata (southeastern South America) and New Granada (northern South America).

Initially, Portuguese settlements (Brazil) in the coastal northeast were of lesser importance in the larger Portuguese overseas empire, where lucrative commerce and small settlements devoted to trade were established in coastal Africa, India and China. With sparse indigenous populations that could not be coerced to work and no known deposits of precious metals, Portugal sought a high-value, low-bulk export product and found it in sugarcane.  Black African slave labour from Portugal's West African possessions was imported to do the grueling agricultural work. As the wealth of the Ibero-America increased, some Western European powers (Dutch, French, British, Danish) sought to duplicate the model in areas that the Iberians had not settled in numbers. They seized some Caribbean islands from the Spanish and transferred the model of sugar production on plantations with slave labour and settled in northern areas of North America in what are now the Eastern Seaboard of the United States and Canada.

Colonial North America 

North America outside the zone of Spanish settlement was a contested area in the 17th century. Spain had founded small settlements in Florida and Georgia but nowhere near the size of those in New Spain or the Caribbean islands. France, The Netherlands, and Great Britain held several colonies in North America and the West Indies from the 17th century, 100 years after the Spanish and Portuguese established permanent colonies. The British colonies in North America were founded between 1607 (Virginia) and 1733 (Georgia). The Dutch explored the east coast of North America and began founding settlements in what they called New Netherland (now New York State.). France colonized what is now Eastern Canada, founding Quebec City in 1608. France's loss in the Seven Years' War resulted in the transfer of New France to Great Britain. The Thirteen Colonies, in lower British North America, rebelled against British rule in 1775, largely due to the taxation that Great Britain was imposing on the colonies. The British colonies in Canada remained loyal to the crown, and a provisional government formed by the Thirteen Colonies proclaimed their independence on July 4, 1776 and subsequently became the original 13 United States of America. With the 1783 Treaty of Paris ending the American Revolutionary War, Britain recognised the former Thirteen Colonies' independence.

Atlantic World

A recent development in early modern history is the creation of Atlantic World as a category. The term generally encompasses western Europe, West Africa, North and South and America and the Caribbean islands. It seeks to show both local and regional development and the connections between the various geographical regions.

Religion, science, philosophy, and education

Eastern philosophies 
Concerning the development of Eastern philosophies, much of Eastern philosophy had been in an advanced state of development from study in the previous centuries. The various philosophies include Indian philosophy, Chinese philosophy, Iranian philosophy, Japanese philosophy, and Korean philosophy.

Muslim world 
The Islamic Golden Age reached its peak in the High Middle Ages, stopped short by the Mongol invasions of the 13th century. The re-establishment of three major Muslim empires by the 16th century (the aforementioned Ottoman Safavid and Mughal Empires) gave rise to a Muslim cultural revival. The Safavids established Twelver Shi'a Islam as Iran's official religion, thus giving Iran a separate identity from its Sunni neighbors.

Protestant Reformation 

The early modern period was initiated by the Protestant Reformation and the collapse of the unity of the medieval Western Church. The theology of Calvinism in particular has been argued as instrumental to the rise of capitalism. Max Weber has written a highly influential book on this called The Protestant Ethic and the Spirit of Capitalism.

Counter-Reformation and Jesuits 

The Counter-Reformation was a period of Catholic revival in response to the Protestant Reformation during the mid-16th to mid-17th centuries. The Counter-Reformation was a comprehensive effort, involving ecclesiastical or structural reforms as well as a political dimension and spiritual movements.

Such reforms included the foundation of seminaries for the proper training of priests in the spiritual life and the theological traditions of the Church, the reform of religious life by returning orders to their spiritual foundations and new spiritual movements focusing on the devotional life and a personal relationship with Christ, including the Spanish mystics and the French school of spirituality. It also involved political activities that included the Roman Inquisition.

New religious orders were a fundamental part of this trend. Orders such as the Capuchins, Ursulines, Theatines, Discalced Carmelites, the Barnabites, and especially the Jesuits strengthened rural parishes, improved popular piety, helped to curb corruption within the church and set examples that would be a strong impetus for Catholic renewal.

Scientific Revolution 

The Great Divergence in scientific discovery, technological innovation, and economic development began in the early modern period as the pace of change in Western countries increased significantly compared to the rest of the world.

During the Scientific Revolution of the 16th and 17 century, empiricism and modern science replaced older methods of studying nature – European research methods that mainly involved reading texts by ancient writers. In ancient times, natural philosophers made observations of nature and came up with explanations, but never conducted experiments to test those explanations, because creating an artificial situation was considered an invalid way to discover the rules of nature. The scientific method of testing hypotheses was first recorded in the 10th century by Ibn al-Haytham (Alhazen), inspiring Roger Bacon to begin experimenting in 13th century Europe. By the time of the Revolution, these methods resulted in accumulation of knowledge that overturned ideas inherited from Ancient Greece (primarily Aristotelian physics, which includes the modern domains of physics, chemistry, biology) through the Middle Ages and Islamic scholars. Major changes of the Scientific Revolution and the 18th century included:
 The ancient geocentric model of the solar system (the planets circle the Earth) was replaced by the heliocentric model (Earth and other planets circle the Sun). Known as the Copernican Revolution, the 1543 publication of Nicolaus Copernicus's De revolutionibus orbium coelestium (On the Revolutions of the Heavenly Spheres, which was influenced by Mu'ayyad al-Din al-Urdi and was based on detailed astronomical observations) is often used to mark the beginning of the Scientific Revolution. Heliocentrism was resisted by the Catholic Church because it contradicted the Bible; the Catholic Inquisition imprisoned Galileo Galilei (sometimes called the "father of modern science" for his many empirical discoveries) for promoting this theory.
 Armed with detailed observations from Tycho Brahe, Johannes Kepler found the idea that the planets moved in ellipses rather than on perfect celestial spheres, publishing Kepler's laws of planetary motion. The commonly held idea that the fixed stars are mounted on a large sphere was replaced by the idea that they are distant suns. Astrology and astronomy began to separate into different disciplines, with only astronomy using scientific methods. Telescope technology improved tremendously as did the study of optics.
 Aristotle's laws of motion were demonstrated to be incorrect, and were replaced by Newton's laws of motion and Newton's law of universal gravitation. The 1687 publication of Isaac Newton's 1687 Principia is often used to mark the end of the Scientific Revolution.
 A revival of atomism (denied by Aristotle) and corpuscularianism began to undermine the classical elements. Both 8th century Islamic experimenter Jabir ibn Hayyan and 17th century Christian experimenter Robert Boyle have been described as the founders of modern chemistry, both worked as alchemists before the fields were clearly separated. Boyle argued for corpuscularism in the 1661 book The Sceptical Chymist, and discovered Boyle's Law of gases. Phlogiston theory was refuted by empirical discovery of conservation of mass, among other discoveries bring the chemical revolution. The discovery of modern chemical elements would not begin until the 19th century in the late modern period, followed by experimental confirmation of atoms.
 Finally overcoming the difficulties human corpses to perform dissections, the anatomical descriptions of the 2nd century Galen were updated by the 1543 publication of De humani corporis fabrica by Andreas Vesalius, considered a foundational text of modern medicine and early modern anatomy. The 1628 work De Motu Cordis by William Harvey was a major advance in the understanding of the circulatory system.
 The field of microbiology began with the invention of the microscope and the first observations of microorganisms, famously by Anton van Leeuwenhoek in the 1670s and probably also by Athanasius Kircher in the 1640s. Though microorganisms were (correctly) proposed as the cause of infectious diseases as soon as they were discovered, this theory was generally dismissed. Though scientific investigation undermined humorism in medicine, miasma theory remained dominant throughout the early modern period. The germ theory of disease was not widely accepted until the 1880s, in the late modern period.
 Modern scientific dentistry was founded by Pierre Fauchard.
 The smallpox vaccine was invented in the 1770s and popularized by Edward Jenner in the 1790s, though it was unclear at the time how it worked.
 Carl Linnaeus published the first modern taxonomy in 1735, replacing Aristotle's Great Chain of Being. Binomial nomenclature was used in publications by Gaspard Bauhin as early as 1622, and by Linnaeus in 1753.
 The ancient theory of spontaneous generation remained dominant throughout the early modern period, but the history of evolutionary thought includes some who questioned the strictest form of this dogma. The idea of partial common descent was famously promoted by Georges-Louis Leclerc, Comte de Buffon. Evolution was not fully articulated and accepted until the 19th century.
 Modern geology began to take shape mainly in the 18th and 19th centuries. Early on, Nicolas Steno proposed the law of superposition in 1669, and various writers in the history of geology began to question the notion derived from the Christian Bible that the Earth was only about 6,000 years old and relatively unchanged over time. Steno and James Hutton are often considered founders of the modern field. The study of fossils and rock types became systematic.
 Early developments in the history of electromagnetism during this era include gradual teasing out of the relationships between electricity, magnetism, and lightning; development of the electrostatic generator and Leyden jar for storage; and the discoveries of ferromagnetism, "electrics" and "non-electrics" (conductors and insulators). The now-obsolete fluid theory of electricity was developed to explain electrical phenomena in terms of "vitreous" and "resinous" fluids (later recognized as positive and negative electrical charges). Electrochemistry was born with the discovery of voltaic electricity (which would provide a power source for later experimentation) and pyroelectricity. Around 1784, Coulomb's law mathematically described the strength of electrical attraction. The discovery that electricity could cause muscles to contract was termed "Galvanic electricity".

In the new social sciences:
 Historical linguistics emerged in the late 18th century as a field after the discovery of the common origin what are now called Indo-European languages by philologist William Jones.
 The fields of anthropology and paleoanthropology emerged in the 18th century, but much of early modern anthropology is now considered scientific racism.
 The 1776 multi-book publication The Wealth of Nations by Adam Smith is considered the foundational text of classical economics.

Scientific discovery would accelerate in the late modern period, and continues today.

Technology

Inventions of the early modern period included the floating dock, lifting tower, newspaper, grenade musket, lightning rod, bifocals, and Franklin stove. Early attempts at building a practical electrical telegraph were hindered because static electricity was the only source available.

Enlightenment and reason 

The Age of Enlightenment is also called the Age of Reason because it marked a change from the medieval tradition of scholasticism based on Christian dogma and the often occultist approach of Renaissance philosophy. Instead, reason became the central source of knowledge, beginning the era of modern philosophy, especially in Western philosophy. The period was typified in Europe by the great system-builders, philosophers who presented unified systems of epistemology, metaphysics, logic, and ethics and often politics and the physical sciences as well.

Early 17th-century philosophy is often called the Age of Rationalism and is considered to succeed Renaissance philosophy and precede the Age of Enlightenment, but some consider it as the earliest part of the Enlightenment era in philosophy, extending that era to two centuries. This era includes Isaac Newton's Principia and René Descartes' "I think therefore I am" (1637). The 18th century saw the beginning of secularization in Europe, rising to notability in the wake of the French Revolution.

Immanuel Kant classified his predecessors into two schools: the rationalists and the empiricists, The three main rationalists are normally taken to have been René Descartes, Baruch Spinoza, and Gottfried Leibniz.

Roger Williams founded Providence Plantations in New England, based on the principle of separation of church and state after being exiled by Puritans in the Massachusetts Bay Colony. The Enlightenment began at Harvard in 1646. The first great advances towards modern science were made in the mid-17th century, most notably the theory of gravity by Isaac Newton (1643–1727). Newton, Spinoza, John Locke (1632–1704) and Pierre Bayle (1647–1706) were philosophers sparking the ideas for the furthering of the Enlightenment.

French salon culture culminated in the Enlightenment's most influential publication, the great Encyclopédie (1751–1772), edited by Denis Diderot (1713–1784) with contributions by hundreds of leading philosophes (intellectuals) such as Voltaire (1694–1778) and Montesquieu (1689–1755). The Quarrel of the Ancients and the Moderns shook up the French Academy in the 1690s, elevating new discoveries over Greek and Roman wisdom. The French Enlightenment was received in Germany, notably fostered by Frederick the Great, the king of Prussia, and gave rise to a flowering of German philosophy, represented foremost by Immanuel Kant.

The French and German developments were further influential in Scottish, Russian, Spanish and Polish philosophy.

The Enlightenment flourished until about 1790–1800, after which the emphasis on reason gave way to Romanticism's emphasis on emotion and a Counter-Enlightenment gained force.

Humanism 

With the adoption of large-scale printing after 1500, Italian Renaissance Humanism spread northward to France, Germany, Holland and England, where it became associated with the Protestant Reformation.

Developing during the Enlightenment era, Renaissance humanism as an intellectual movement spread across Europe. The basic training of the humanist was to speak well and write (typically, in the form of a letter). The term umanista comes from the latter part of the 15th century. The people were associated with the studia humanitatis, a novel curriculum that was competing with the quadrivium and scholastic logic.

In France, pre-eminent Humanist Guillaume Budé (1467–1540) applied the philological methods of Italian Humanism to the study of antique coinage and to legal history, composing a detailed commentary on Justinian's Code. Although a royal absolutist (and not a republican like the early Italian umanisti), Budé was active in civic life, serving as a diplomat for Francis I and helping to found the Collège des Lecteurs Royaux (later the Collège de France). Meanwhile, Marguerite de Navarre, the sister of Francis I, herself a poet, novelist and religious mystic, gathered around her and protected a circle of vernacular poets and writers, including Clément Marot, Pierre de Ronsard and François Rabelais.

Death in the early modern period

Mortality rates 
During the early modern period, thorough and accurate global data on mortality rates is limited for a number of reasons including disparities in medical practices and views on the dead. However, there still remains data from European countries that still holds valuable information on the mortality rates of infants during this era. In his book Life Under Pressure: Mortality and Living Standards in Europe and Asia, 1700–1900, Tommy Bengtsson provides adequate information pertaining to the data of infant mortality rates in European countries as well as provide necessary contextual influences on these mortality rates.

European infant mortality rates 
Infant mortality was a global concern during the early modern period as many newborns would not survive into childhood. Bengsston provides comparative data on infant mortality averages in a variety of European towns, cities, regions and countries starting from the mid-1600s to the 1800s. These statistics are measured for infant deaths within the first month of every 1,000 births in a given area.

For instance, the average infant mortality rate in what is now Germany was 108 infant deaths for every 1,000 births; in Bavaria, there were 140-190 infant deaths reported for every 1,000 births. In France, Beauvaisis reported 140-160 infants dying per every 1,000 babies born. In what is now Italy, Venice averaged 134 infant deaths per 1,000 births. In Geneva, 80-110 infants died per every 1,000 babies born. In Sweden, 70-95 infants died per 1,000 births in Linköping, 48 infants died per 1,000 births in Sundsvall, and 41 infants died per 1,000 births in Vastanfors.

Causes of infant mortality 
Bengsston writes that climate conditions were the most important factor in determining infant mortality rates: "For the period from birth to the fifth birthday, [climate] is clearly the most important determinant of death". Winters proved to be harsh on families and their newborns, especially if the other seasons of the year were warmer. This seasonal drop in temperature was a lot for an infant's body to adapt to.

For instance, Italy is home to a very warm climate in the summer, and the temperature drops immensely in the winter. This lends context to Bengsston writing that "the [Italian] winter peak was the cruelest: during the first 10 days of life, a newborn was four times more likely to die than in the summer". According to Bengsston, this trend existed amongst cities in different parts of Italy and in various parts of Europe even though cities operated under different economic and agricultural conditions. This leads Bengsston to his conclusion on what may have caused mortality rates in infants to spike during winter: "The strong protective effect of summer for neonatal deaths leads us to suppose that in many cases, these might be due to the insufficient heating systems of the houses or to the exposure of the newborn to cold during the baptism ceremony. This last hypothesis could explain why the effect was so strong in Italy".

Capital punishment 

During the early modern period, many societies' views on death changed greatly. With the implementation of new torture techniques, and increased public executions, people began to give more value to their life, and their body after death. Along with the views on death, methods of execution also changed. New devices to torture and execute criminals were invented. The number of criminals executed by gibbeting increased, as did the total rate of executions during the early modern period.

End of the early modern period 

The end of the early modern period is usually associated with the Industrial Revolution, which began in Britain around 1750, but began to make substantial changes in many European countries by around 1800.

The Age of Revolutions starts at the end of the early modern period and continues into the late modern period, denoting in the decline of absolutism in Europe. Near the end of the early modern period were the Second Treaty of Paris which ended the American Revolution, the French Revolution in 1789, and the Napoleonic Wars. The Congress of Vienna in 1815 marked the end of this period of political upheaval and frequent war, with the rise of new concepts of nationalism and reorganization of military forces. 1815 is the latest year commonly reckoned as the end of the early modern period.

The French Revolutions 

Toward the middle and latter stages of the Age of Revolution, the French political and social revolutions and radical change saw the French governmental structure transform. It was previously an absolute monarchy with feudal privileges for the aristocracy and Catholic clergy. It changed to forms based on Enlightenment principles of citizenship and inalienable rights. The first revolution led to government by the National Assembly, the second by the Legislative Assembly, and the third by the Directory.

The changes were accompanied by violent turmoil, which included the trial and execution of Louis XVI, vast bloodshed and repression during the Reign of Terror, and the French Revolutionary Wars involving every other major European power. Subsequent events that can be traced to the Revolution include the Napoleonic Wars, two separate restorations of the monarchy, and two additional revolutions as modern France took shape. In the following century, France would be governed at one point or another as a republic, constitutional monarchy, and two different empires.

See also 

 Price revolution
 Proto-globalization
 Early modern warfare
 Periodization
 Atlantic history
 Timeline of early modern history
 Cuisine in the early modern world

Notes

References

Further reading 

 
 
 
 
 
 
 
 
  Excerpt.
 
 
  online review; 904pp; short articles on Britain by experts.
 
  A highly influential statement.
   excerpt.
   excerpt.

External links 
 Internet Modern History Sourcebook, fordham.edu
 Discussion of the medieval/modern transition from the introduction to the pioneering Cambridge Modern History (1902–1912)
 Society for Renaissance Studies
 Early Modern Culture (archived 25 September 2011)
 Early Modern Resources

 
Historical eras
History of Europe by period
 
.
.
.
.
Articles which contain graphical timelines
World history